Phallus celebicus is a species of fungus in the stinkhorn family. It was described as new to science in 1900 by Paul Christoph Hennings. It is found in India.

References

External links

Fungi of Asia
Fungi described in 1900
Phallales
Taxa named by Paul Christoph Hennings